Javier "Harvey" Guillén (born ) is an American actor who is best known for his role as the human familiar Guillermo de la Cruz in the 2019 television series What We Do in the Shadows.

Career

Guillén has appeared in recurring roles on a number of television series, such as Alistair Delgado on Huge (2010), Cousin Blobbin on The Thundermans (2013–2018), George Reyes in Eye Candy (2015), and Benedict Fenwick on The Magicians (2017–2018). He also appeared in the 2013 film The Internship.

Beginning in 2019, Guillén has played the role of Guillermo, the vampires' human familiar, in the FX television series What We Do in the Shadows. He was also set to appear in Quibi's science fiction drama series Don't Look Deeper, before the platform shut down in December 2020.

Guillén has received considerable acclaim for his role as Guillermo. TheWrap included Guillén in a list of "2019 Emmy Contenders". Hank Steuver, in his review of What We Do in the Shadows in The Chicago Tribune, stated that Guillén "provides at least half the big laughs" in the show.

Guillén provides the voice of Funny the Magic House in Mickey Mouse Funhouse. Guillén played Nightwing in season 3 of Harley Quinn.

In 2023, Guillén appeared on The Late Show with Stephen Colbert where he appeared in a skit as Representative George Santos.

Personal life
Guillén is the son of Mexican immigrants. He adopted the name Harvey when his teachers could not pronounce his first name.

He identifies as queer.

Filmography

Film

Television

Awards and nominations

References

External links
 

21st-century American male actors
American male film actors
American male television actors
American male voice actors
American LGBT actors
LGBT male actors
Living people
Queer actors
Queer men
1990 births
Place of birth missing (living people)
American actors of Mexican descent
Actors from Orange County, California
American male actors of Mexican descent
LGBT Hispanic and Latino American people